There's Always Tomorrow is a 1934 American drama film directed by Edward Sloman and written by William Hurlbut. The film stars Frank Morgan, Binnie Barnes, Lois Wilson, Louise Latimer, Elizabeth Young and Alan Hale Sr. The film was released on November 1, 1934, by Universal Pictures.

Plot

Cast 
Frank Morgan as Joseph White
Binnie Barnes as Alice Vail
Lois Wilson as Sophie White
Louise Latimer as Janet White
Elizabeth Young as Helen Graham
Alan Hale Sr. as Henry
Robert Taylor as Arthur White
Maurice Murphy as Fred White
Dick Winslow as Dick White
Helen Parrish as Marjorie White
Margaret Hamilton as Ella

See also
 There's Always Tomorrow (1956 film)

References

External links
 

1934 films
American drama films
1934 drama films
Universal Pictures films
Films directed by Edward Sloman
American black-and-white films
1930s English-language films
1930s American films